C/2022 E3 (ZTF) is a long-period comet from the Oort cloud that was discovered by the Zwicky Transient Facility (ZTF) on 2 March 2022. The comet has a bright green glow around its nucleus, due to the effect of sunlight on diatomic carbon and cyanogen. The comet's systematic designation starts with C to indicate that it is not a periodic comet, and "2022 E3" means that it was the third comet to be discovered in the first half of March 2022.

The comet nucleus was estimated to be about a kilometer in size, rotating every 8.5 to 8.7 hours. Its tails of dust and gas extended for millions of kilometers and, during January 2023, an anti-tail was also visible.

The comet reached magnitude 5 and was visible with the naked eye under moonless dark skies.

Observational history

Discovery 
Astronomers Bryce Bolin and Frank Masci discovered C/2022 E3 (ZTF) using the Zwicky Transient Facility (ZTF) survey, which uses the 1.2-m f/2.4 Schmidt telescope at Palomar Observatory, on 2 March 2022.

The object was initially identified as an asteroid, but subsequent observations revealed it had a very condensed coma, indicating it is a comet. H. Sato reported its coma was 8 arcseconds across in stacked photos he obtained from the remote observatory in Mayhill, New Mexico, while K. Yoshimoto reported its coma was 15 arcseconds across and the comet had a small tail 25 arcseconds long.

The comet was subsequently detected in images taken by Pan-STARRS 1 in Haleakalā Observatory, Hawai'i on 10 July 2021, when the comet had an apparent magnitude of 23. The comet had also been photographed without being noticed by ZTF in October and November 2021.

Near perihelion 
By early November 2022, the comet had brightened to magnitude 10 and was appearing to move slowly in Corona Borealis and Serpens as it moved parallel to Earth. The comet exhibited a green coma and a yellowish dust tail and a faint ion tail. The comet was visible in the early evening and started being visible in the morning sky by the end of November. By 19 December, the comet had developed a greenish coma, a short, broad dust tail, and a long faint ion tail stretching across a 2.5-degree wide field of view. After that, the comet started moving northward, passing through Boötes, Draco, and Ursa Minor, passing within about 10 degrees of Polaris by the end of January.

The first naked-eye observations of the comet occurred on 16 and 17 January, with the comet having an estimated magnitude of 5.4 and 6.0 respectively. Strong solar wind from a coronal mass ejection caused a disconnection event of the ion tail of the comet on 17 January, making it appear broken. On 22 January an anti-tail became visible. This tail appears pointing toward the Sun and opposite the dust and ion tails. It is caused by particles lying on a disk on the orbital plane of the comet, and when Earth aligns with that plane, they look like a reverse tail.

As of 31 January 2023, the comet had an apparent magnitude of about 5; its coma was reported to be about 20' across. During its closest approach to Earth, it was near the north celestial pole and located within the Camelopardalis constellation. The moon was a waxing gibbous and the brightening moon hampered viewing the comet without optical aid. On 5 February, at the full moon, the comet passed 1.5 degrees from the bright star Capella. On 6 February, C/2022 E3 (ZTF) visually passed near comet C/2022 U2 (ATLAS). On 10 to 11 February, the comet passed 1.5 degrees from Mars and, on 13 to 15 February, will pass in front of the Hyades star cluster.

Color 
The green color is likely due to the presence of diatomic carbon, chiefly around the comet's head. The C2 molecule, when excited by the solar ultraviolet radiation, emits mostly in infrared, but its triplet state radiates at 518 nm (nanometers). It is produced by photolysis of organic materials evaporated from the nucleus. It then undergoes further photolysis, with a lifetime of about two days, at which time the green glow appears in the comet's head but not the tail. The comet researcher Matthew Knight opined that the green color of this comet is not unusual for comets with a higher gas content, but they only rarely approach the Earth as close so it provides for very good observation of the greenish hue. In the spectrum of the comet in the wavelength range between 5000 and 7000 Å many emission lines of NH2, C2, and [OI] are detected.  Similar colors were seen with observations of comet C/2021 A1 (Leonard).

Outbound trajectory 
Post perihelion, the outbound orbit solution is not bound to the Sun. Using a heliocentric orbit at epoch 2495 with just the Sun's mass also shows the comet unbound to the Solar System. The Sun's escape velocity at 200 AU is 2.98 km/s and the comet will be going 3.09 km/s at 200 AU from the Sun. The comet will either leave the Solar System altogether or return in many millions of years depending on perturbations from outgassing (non-gravitational forces) or perturbations while in the Oort cloud by the galactic tide and passing stars.

Comparable objects

Gallery

References

External links 
 

20220302
Comets in 2023
Long-period comets